Drimoleague (historically Drumdalege) is a village on the R586 road at its junction with the R593 in County Cork, Ireland. It lies roughly halfway between the towns of Dunmanway and Bantry, within the civil parish of Dromdaleague. As of the 2016 census of Ireland, Drimoleague had 451 residents.

History 
Drimoleague is located in West Cork in the townlands of Baurnahulla and Dromdaleague. Evidence of ancient settlement within these townlands includes a number of ecclesiastical, souterrain, holy well and fulacht fia sites.

Drimoleague is the start for one of the five Pilgrim Paths of Ireland, St. Finbar's Pilgrim Path, which ends 35-kilometers away in Gougane Barra. The village's Anglican (Church of Ireland) church was built in 1790, and is now in ruin. The local Methodist church was built . In 1956, a new Catholic church was completed on the site of an older church. Designed by architect Frank Murphy, it is credited as being West Cork's first building in the modernist style.

Drimoleague railway station opened in 1877 on the Cork, Bandon and South Coast Railway line. It closed in the early 1960s.

The TV series Holding, based on the similarly titled book by Graham Norton, was filmed in the village and surrounding area in 2021.

Amenities
Local amenities include four public houses, a pitch & putt course, tennis courts, and a children's playground. The local national (primary) school, Drimoleague National School, had an enrollment of 59 pupils as of 2021. Clann na nGael GAA club has facilities at Páirc Tadhg Na Samhna in Drimoleague.

Gallery

References

Towns and villages in County Cork